Reperfusion is the restoration of blood flow to an organ or tissue after having been blocked, and may refer to:

 Reperfusion injury, tissue damage caused when blood supply returns to the tissue
 Reperfusion therapy, the medical treatment that restores blood flow through blocked arteries, typically after a heart attack